Teleopsis sykesii is the type species of the genus Teleopsis of stalk-eyed flies in the family Diopsidae. This species was described from India

Distribution
This species is distributed in India (Maharashtra, Goa, Karnataka, Kerala, Tamil Nadu) and Myanmar

References

Diopsidae
Insects described in 1837